Monardella arizonica is a plant species endemic to Arizona in the United States, known by the common name Arizona monardella.

Ancient history
The species has been confirmed to have been native to northern Arizona since at least the Late Wisconsin late glacial period based upon pollen core analysis at the Waterman Mountains (Coconino County) - (not the Waterman Mountains of Pima County); dominant trees of Juniperus osteosperma and Pinus monophylla remain extant species to the present time in this predominantly Pinyon-juniper woodland.

Description
The two-lipped, tubular flowers are formed in terminal clusters.

Horticulture and ecology
The species has reasonable frost resistance, but resents dampness in winter. The plant can be propagated from seed or summer cuttings of perennial species, or by division of clumps.

See also
 Monardella viridis

References
 C. Michael Hogan. 2009. Elephant Tree: Bursera microphylla, GlobalTwitcher.com, ed. N. Stromberg

Line notes

External links
 

arizonica
Flora of Arizona
Endemic flora of the United States
Garden plants of North America
Drought-tolerant plants
Groundcovers
Flora without expected TNC conservation status